Lădești is a commune located in Vâlcea County, Oltenia, Romania. It is composed of ten villages: Cermegești, Chiricești, Ciumagi, Dealu Corni, Găgeni, Lădești, Măldărești, Olteanca, Păsculești and Popești.

The river Cerna passes by the commune Lădești.

Natives
 Virgil Ierunca, literary critic, poet

References

Communes in Vâlcea County
Localities in Oltenia